The Tomsk State University of Architecture and Building is located in Tomsk, Russia.

Tomsk State University of Architecture and Building (TSUAB) is one of the civil engineering universities in Western Siberia. TSUAB provides fundamental and applied training of students within bachelor, master and specialist programs in architecture and civil engineering.

History 
TSUAB history dates back to 1901 when the First Siberian Merchant School was established. In 1904 merchants of Tomsk put their efforts together with city authorities to construct special building for the school which is currently known as the second building of TSUAB ("the red one"). The project was headed by famous architect Konstantin K. Lygin. During Revolution and Civil War the school turned from specialized educational establishment into higher education institution: at Kolchak time it was occupied by Academy of General Staff of Russian Army evacuated from Moscow, further at Soviet times it turned into First Siberian Applied Polytechnic Institute. 
To raise prestige of secondary specialized schools in 1923 when they were subjected to reformation, the school was reorganized in the First Siberian Polytechnic College named after K.A. Timiryazev. That was an example of a classic educational institution on the east of the country. Industrial development in 1930 defines the necessity of fast growth in the number of technical schools and Tomsk Polytechnic College is divided into many new Tomsk technical schools, Polytechnic College is disestablished.
One of them, Tomsk Milling-Elevator Technical School (training specialists-technicians and site engineers for construction of elevators in Siberia), was located in buildings on Solyanaya Square. However, next year in 1931 governmental decree was issued to reorganize technical school into Tomsk Milling-Elevator Institute. The Institute also got the neighboring building – the former building of NKVD (The People's Commissariat for Internal Affairs). It was reformed as an additional academic building of new university. Nowadays it is the third building of TSUAB (symbolic elevator and year of this emblem creation can still be seen on the fronton). In 1939 another governmental decision relocates the Institute back to Moscow and the available buildings are given to Tomsk Milling-Elevator Technical School (second organization). In 1943 it was renamed into Tomsk Polytechnic (second organization). 
Modern educational establishment "Tomsk State University of Architecture and Building" begins its history from 1952 when governmental decision was to establish a new institute – Tomsk Institute for Training Engineers Constructing Elevators on the base of Tomsk Polytechnic Ministry of Provision of USSR. In 1953 the Institute obtained the status of Tomsk Engineering Construction Institute. In 1960-1961 the university became one of the leading civil engineering institutes of Siberia; it was among the five of best engineering and construction universities of the country.

In 1993 Tomsk Engineering Construction Institute was renamed into Tomsk State Architectural Construction Academy. In 1997 the university got the status of university and was renamed into Tomsk State University of Architecture and Building. 
TSUAB started its work from faculty of Civil Engineering, the faculty trained specialists within "Civil and Industrial Engineering Program". First year enrollment was provided by 15 professors. In 1957 103 civil engineers and 48 water-engineers became first graduated from the university and were forwarded to the largest construction projects of the country. Since the foundation until now the university trained more than 55 thousand of qualified engineers. 
In 1960-1980s TSUAB trained students within 5 faculties (civil engineering, road construction, machinery, technology and architecture) as well as provided part-time and distance teaching in 7 specialties; research work has been actively developing, foundation for the formation of scientific schools and research directions has been laid. 
Significant role has been played by 6 rectors of the university: Potokin A.A. (1952—1953), Zhestkov S.V. (1953—1955), Damanskii L.M. (1955—1958), Postnikov M.V. (1958—1968), Rogov G.M.  (1968—2005 гг.), Slobodskoi M.I. (2005—2012).
Gennady M. Rogov, Prof. Dr., headed the university for 37 years (1968 – 2005) and contributed greatly into university development. The university was converted into university complex: new faculties were established, as well as new institutes and university branches, new specialties were opened, 6 new academic buildings were commissioned together with four students’ dormitories, child care center, children health center, sport complex, etc.

In 2005 – 2012 the university was headed by Mikhail I. Slobodskoi. The university opened architectural and construction incubator, providing undergraduates, master students and young researchers with information, material and technical and legal support for realization of their creative projects and ideas. 
Currently the university is headed by professor Viktor A. Vlasov, Dr., honoured worker of science and technology of the Russian Federation, full member of International Higher Education Academy of Sciences and International Authors’ Academy of scientific discoveries and inventions, presidium member and educational-methodological association of civil engineering universities, chair of expert board in construction and infrastructure by the governor of Tomsk Region, member of Public Chamber of Tomsk Region, chair and member of 2 doctoral dissertation councils, honoured worker of higher professional education of Russia.

Organizational structure

Centers 
 Tomsk Construction Certification Center 
 Testing Center of Oil and Lubricants and Vehicles
 Regional Center of Open Network
 Scientific and Technical Center "Automatics" 
 Center of Career Guidance and Employment 
 E-learning Center 
 IT-center

University branches  
 Asino branch of Tomsk State University of Architecture and Building. Address: Partizanskaya St. 47, 636800, Asino (Tomsk Region) Russia
 Belovo branch of Tomsk State University of Architecture and Building. Address: Tekhnologichesky Distr. 11, 652644, Belovo (Kemerovo Region)
 Leninsk-Kuznetsk branch of Tomsk State University of Architecture and Building. Address: Kishinevsky Lane 21A, 652500, Leninsk-Kuznetsk (Kemerovo Region)
 Novokuznetsk branch of Tomsk State University of Architecture and Building. Address: Den’ Shakhtera St. 15A, 654086, Novokuznetsk (Kemerovo Region)
 Strezhevoi branch of Tomsk State University of Architecture and Building. Address: Ermakova St. 127A, 636762, Strezhevoi (Tomsk Region)

International activities 
University collaborates with public organizations, scientific and educational organizations of Germany, France, Italy, Kazakhstan, Kyrgyzstan, Mongolia, Bulgaria, Ukraine, Vietnam, Poland, Azerbaijan, China.

Material and technical facilities  
 Sport complex with playing halls;
 Stadium with football field and hockey rink;
 University sanatorium;
 Preschool;
 Health and education center for children "Yunyi Tomich";
 Geodesic ground in the village Yarskoe.

Museum Complex 
Museum of TSUAB history and museum of Geoinformation Technology and Cadastre Institute collecting and storing documents and archives organize expositions and temporary exhibitions; also organize anniversary meetings of graduates, annual quiz on the university history, excursions on cultural objects of the city and other events.

TSUAB Publishing Office

Students’ life

Culture and creativity 
•	Institutional club;
•	The union of literature fans "Yarus";
•	Society of volunteers "Vykhod".

Sport 
Sport club actively organizes and participates in sport competitions of different levels (university, city, regional and Russian national), solves the crucial problems of developing the leading university sportsmen, as well as general physical development and health improvement of students and staff.  Priority sports at TSUAB are biathlon, boxing, kettlebell lifting, basketball, karate, sambo, track and field athletics, football, table tennis, skiing.

Students construction brigades

External links
 Tomsk State University of Architecture and Building

Universities in Tomsk Oblast
Universities and institutes established in the Soviet Union
Educational institutions established in 1952
Tomsk
Architecture schools in Russia
1952 establishments in the Soviet Union